Mefjorden is a fjord in Senja Municipality in Troms og Finnmark county, Norway. The villages of Mefjordvær and Senjahopen are located at the southern side of the fjord, and at the innermost point in the fjord is the village of Mefjordbotn.

References

Fjords of Troms og Finnmark
Senja